Mukul Devichand (born in Wales, UK) is Editor of Audio Programming for the New York Times. Previously he was Executive Editor of Voice + AI for the BBC. He was the original creator and editor of the Webby award-winning  BBC Trending unit, and of the solutions-focussed journalism unit BBC World Hacks. Both teams are based in London and create digital video output, text, podcasts and radio shows for the BBC World Service and BBC News website. Previously he was a presenter and producer for BBC Radio 4. His work includes programmes such as Crossing Continents, Analysis, From Our Own Correspondent and The Report. He has also presented Our World, a BBC World TV show. In 2009, with Crossing Continents producer John Murphy, he won a One World Media Award for their reporting in Mumbai slums.

He is a graduate of the London School of Economics.

References

External links 

 
 Mukul Devichand's biography on the BBC website
 http://www.newstatesman.com/writers/mukul_devichand
 http://news.bbc.co.uk/2/hi/business/8664835.stm

Living people
British radio presenters
Welsh radio presenters
Alumni of the London School of Economics
Year of birth missing (living people)